The Guidance of Reason is a short film written and directed by Aliocha. It has been selected to be part of the Directors Fortnight of the 2011 Cannes Film Festival.

Plot
A man and his dog go for a walk in the woods.

Cast
 Jean-François Brunier - Jean-François Brunier
 Athos - Dog
 Jean-Pierre Dalaise - Jean-Pierre Dalaise

External links
 
 La conduite de la Raison on Facebook
 La conduite de la Raison at CinemaItaliano.info

2010 films
French drama short films
2010s French-language films
Films directed by Aliocha
2010s French films